This is a list of cities, towns, and communities along the Potomac River and its branches in the United States.

Potomac River

Alphabetically

Alexandria, Virginia
Arlington, Virginia
Belle Haven, Virginia
Bolivar, West Virginia
Brookmont, Maryland
Brunswick, Maryland
Cabin John, Maryland
Campbells, West Virginia
Carderock, Maryland
Cherry Run, West Virginia
Colonial Beach, Virginia
Dahlgren, Virginia
Darnestown, Maryland
Fairview Beach, Virginia
Falling Waters, West Virginia
Forest Heights, Maryland
Fort Belvoir, Virginia
Fort Hunt, Virginia
Fort Washington, Maryland
Georgetown, District of Columbia
Glen Echo, Maryland
Great Cacapon, West Virginia
Great Falls, Virginia
Green Ridge, West Virginia
Groveton, Virginia
Hancock, Maryland
Hancock, West Virginia
Hansrote, West Virginia
Harpers Ferry, West Virginia
Huntington, Virginia
Indian Head, Maryland
Jerome, West Virginia
Langley, Virginia
Leesburg, Virginia
Lewisetta, Virginia
Lineburg, West Virginia
Little Cacapon, West Virginia
Little Georgetown, West Virginia
Little Orleans, Maryland
Loudoun Heights, Virginia
Magnolia, West Virginia
Mason Neck, Virginia
McLean, Virginia
Morgantown, Maryland
Mount Vernon, Virginia
Okonoko, West Virginia
Orleans Cross Roads, West Virginia
Paw Paw, West Virginia
Point Lookout, Maryland
Point of Rocks, Maryland
Potomac, Maryland
Potomac Heights, Maryland
Quantico, Virginia
River Creek, Virginia
Shepherdstown, West Virginia
Sir Johns Run, West Virginia
Sleepy Creek, West Virginia
South Branch Depot, West Virginia
Sterling, Virginia
Town Creek, Maryland
Travilah, Maryland
Washington, D.C.
Williamsport, Maryland
Woodmont, West Virginia

Alphabetically by state

District of Columbia
Georgetown
Washington

Maryland
Brookmont
Brunswick
Cabin John
Carderock
Darnestown
Forest Heights
Fort Washington
Glen Echo
Hancock
Indian Head
Little Orleans
Morgantown
Point Lookout
Point of Rocks
Potomac
Potomac Heights
Town Creek
Travilah
Williamsport

Virginia
Alexandria
Arlington
Belle Haven
Colonial Beach
Dahlgren
Dale City
Fairview Beach
Fort Belvoir
Fort Hunt
Great Falls
Groveton
Huntington
Langley
Leesburg
Lewisetta
Loudoun Heights
Mason Neck
McLean
Mount Vernon
Quantico
Woodbridge

West Virginia
Bolivar
Campbells
Cherry Run
Falling Waters
Great Cacapon
Green Ridge
Hancock
Hansrote
Harpers Ferry
Lineburg
Little Cacapon
Little Georgetown
Magnolia
Okonoko
Orleans Cross Roads
Paw Paw
Shepherdstown
Sir Johns Run
Sleepy Creek
South Branch Depot
Woodmont
Moorefield West Virginia

North Branch Potomac River

Alphabetically

Barnum, West Virginia
Bayard, West Virginia
Beryl, West Virginia
Blaine, West Virginia
Bloomington, Maryland
Bowling Green, Maryland
Carpendale, West Virginia
Cresaptown, Maryland
Cumberland, Maryland
Dans Run, West Virginia
Forge Hill, West Virginia
Gorman, Maryland
Gormania, West Virginia
Green Spring, West Virginia
Hampshire, West Virginia
Henry, West Virginia
Keyser, West Virginia
Kitzmiller, Maryland
Luke, Maryland
McCoole, Maryland
North Branch, Maryland
Oldtown, Maryland
Patterson Creek, West Virginia
Piedmont, West Virginia
Pinto, Maryland
Potomac Park, Maryland
Rawlings, Maryland
Ridgeley, West Virginia
Rocket Center, West Virginia
Wagoner, West Virginia
Westernport, Maryland
Wiley Ford, West Virginia

Alphabetically by state

Maryland
Bloomington
Bowling Green
Cresaptown
Cumberland
Gorman
Kitzmiller
Luke
McCoole
North Branch
Oldtown
Pinto
Potomac Park
Rawlings
Westernport

West Virginia
Barnum
Bayard
Beryl
Blaine
Carpendale
Dans Run
Forge Hill
Gormania
Green Spring
Hampshire
Henry
Keyser
Patterson Creek
Piedmont
Ridgeley
Rocket Center
Wagoner
Wiley Ford

South Branch Potomac River

Alphabetically

Blue Grass, Virginia
Blues Beach, West Virginia
Cave, West Virginia
Cunningham, West Virginia
Durgon, West Virginia
Fisher, West Virginia
Franklin, West Virginia
Glebe, West Virginia
Grace, West Virginia
Harper, West Virginia
Hightown, Virginia
Ketterman, West Virginia
McNeill, West Virginia
Moorefield, West Virginia
New Hampden, Virginia
Old Fields, West Virginia
Pancake, West Virginia
Petersburg, West Virginia
Ridgedale, West Virginia
Romney, West Virginia
Ruddle, West Virginia
Sector, West Virginia
Upper Tract, West Virginia
Vanderlip, West Virginia
Wapocomo, West Virginia

Alphabetically by state

Virginia
Blue Grass
Forks of Waters
Hightown
New Hampden

West Virginia
Blues Beach
Cave
Cunningham
Durgon
Fisher
Franklin
Glebe
Grace
Harper
Ketterman
McNeill
Moorefield
Old Fields
Pancake
Petersburg
Ridgedale
Romney
Ruddle
Sector
Upper Tract
Vanderlip
Wapocomo

North Fork South Branch Potomac River

Alphabetically

Cabins, West Virginia
Cherry Grove, West Virginia
Circleville, West Virginia
Hopeville, West Virginia
Macksville, West Virginia
Riverton, West Virginia
Seneca Rocks, West Virginia

South Fork South Branch Potomac River

Alphabetically
Brake, West Virginia
Fame, West Virginia
Fort Seybert, West Virginia
Milam, West Virginia
Moorefield, West Virginia
Oak Flat, West Virginia
Palo Alto, Virginia
Peru, West Virginia
Propstburg, West Virginia
Sugar Grove, West Virginia
Tannery, West Virginia

Alphabetically by state

Virginia
Palo Alto

West Virginia
Brake
Fame
Fort Seybert
Milam
Moorefield
Oak Flat
Peru
Propstburg
Sugar Grove
Tannery

 
Maryland geography-related lists
Virginia geography-related lists
West Virginia geography-related lists
 
Potomac
Potomac, Cities and towns